Don Ellis at Fillmore is a live double-LP by big band leader Don Ellis which was released in 1970.

Reception

Al Campbell of Allmusic said "This is a crazy and consistently riotous two-disc set that features the Don Ellis Orchestra at its height". On All About Jazz, Jim Santella observed "Don Ellis takes you off on a whirlwind ride, using electronic trumpet, complex meters, superb big band arrangements, and a cast of experienced sidemen who blow the walls down"

Track listing

Side A
 "Final Analysis" (Don Ellis) – 13:59
 "Excursion #2"  (John Klemmer) – 5:44
 "The Magic Bus Ate My Doughnut"  (Fred Selden) – 2:29

Side B
 "The Blues"  (Ellis) – 7:25
 "Salvatore Sam"  (Ellis) – 5:06
 "Rock Odyssey"  (Hank Levy) – 9:48

Side C
 "Hey Jude"  (Lennon–McCartney) – 10:38
 "Antea"  (Levy) – 5:59
 "Old Man's Tear"  (Klemmer) – 4:53

Side D
 "Great Divide"  (Ellis) – 8:42
 "Pussy Wiggle Stomp"  (Ellis) – 11:54

Personnel
Don Ellis - trumpet, drums
John Klemmer - tenor saxophone
Jay Graydon - guitar  
John Rosenberg, Stuart Blumberg, Glenn Stuart, Jack Coan - trumpets
Ernie Carlson, Glenn Ferris - trombone 
Don Switzer - bass trombone 
Lonnie Shetter, Fred Selden, Jon Clarke, Sam Falzone - woodwinds
Doug Bixby - contrabass trombone, tuba 
Tom Garvin - piano
Dennis F. Parker - bass 
Ralph Humphrey - drums
Ron Dunn - drums 
Lee Pastora - congas

References

Don Ellis live albums
1970 live albums
Columbia Records live albums
Live big band albums